Praenestinian was an archaic dialect of Latino-Faliscan. It was spoken in eastern Old Latium in modern day Lazio.

References

Latino-Faliscan languages